The 2015 Washington Kastles season was the eighth season of the franchise in World TeamTennis (WTT).

The Kastles won their WTT-record fifth consecutive King Trophy when they defeated the Austin Aces in the WTT Championship Match. The Kastles were led by Leander Paes, who was named WTT Final Most Valuable Player, and Anastasia Rodionova, who was named WTT Female Co-Most Valuable Player.

Season recap

Draft
At the WTT Draft on March 16, 2015, it was announced that the world's number 1 female player Serena Williams had been assigned by the league to the Kastles as a designated player. The Kastles also protected Martina Hingis, Venus Williams, Leander Paes and Anastasia Rodionova. They used their first-round selection in the roster portion of the draft to pick roster-exempt player Sam Querrey. The league's designation of Serena Williams made it impossible for her to be drafted by any other team and relieved the Kastles of having to draft her along with her sister Venus as a marquee doubles team in the second round of the marquee portion of the draft. This will allow the Kastles to protect only one of Serena and Venus in the following season's draft should the other decide not to participate in the league in 2016.

Other player transactions
On May 6, 2015, the Kastles signed Madison Brengle as a substitute player.

On June 26, 2015, the Kastles signed Denis Kudla, a resident of nearby Arlington County, Virginia, as a substitute player.

On July 10, 2015, the Kastles announced the signing of Rajeev Ram as a substitute for Leander Paes, who was scheduled to play in the mixed doubles final at Wimbledon on the same day as the Kastles' season opener.

Serena Williams injured
On July 20, 2015, the Kastles announced that Serena Williams would be unable to play for the team in 2016, due to an injury. Fans attending the Kastles' July 21 match in which Williams was scheduled to play were given choices of either a $10 voucher redeemable at food concession stands, a 50% discount on purchases of Kastles gear up to $50 or a free ticket to a future home match.

Winning streak and a playoff berth after a mediocre start
After the team announced the injury to Serena Williams, the Kastles lost a road match in which she was originally scheduled to play that same evening against the Philadelphia Freedoms, 18–16, and saw their record drop to 4 wins and 3 losses at the midway point of the season.

Despite the slow start, one of the Kastles' wins came on July 18, by a score of 23–6 over the Freedoms. The 17-game margin of victory matched the largest in franchise history. The previous 17-game margins came on July 22, 2012, against the Kansas City Explorers and July 9, 2014, against the Boston Lobsters. Both of those matches ended with 25–8 final scores. In this match, the Kastles actually lost the opening set and trailed the match, 5–3. From there, they won 20 of the next 21 games, including all of the final 16.

As the Kastles embarked on the second half of their season, the team regrouped and dominated the Lobsters at home, 25–13, earning the first of what would be five straight wins. The Kastles set a new home attendance record in the match with 4,255 fans passing through the gates. After a night off, the Kastles faced the Lobsters again and repeated the feat of sweeping all five sets in a 25–14 victory.

The Kastles' big test came on July 24, when they went on the road to face the Austin Aces, who entered the match with 8 wins and only 1 loss. The Kastles had already suffered a home loss at the hands of the Aces early in the season. The Kastles won four of the five sets for a convincing 22–14 victory that improved their record to 7–3 and clinched the team's fifth consecutive playoff berth. Martina Hingis led the way, teaming with Leander Paes in the first set of mixed doubles and Anastasia Rodionova in the second set of women's doubles to give the Kastles an early 10–4 lead. Paes and Sam Querrey took the fourth set of men's doubles to extend the lead to 17–11, before Querrey took the final set of men's singles, 5–3, over Teymuraz Gabashvili to close out the match.

The following night, the Kastles clinched the top seed in the Eastern Conference and home-court advantage for the Eastern Conference Championship Match when the California Dream defeated the Lobsters, 21–19, in extended play.

Late-season showdown
On July 28, 2015, the four-time defending WTT champion Kastles visited he Austin Aces, who entered the match with 10 wins and 2 losses and a chance to clinch the best overall regular-season record in WTT for 2015. A win by the Kastles would have given them control of their own destiny in the race for the WTT's top overall seed, and they would need only a home victory the following night against the Boston Lobsters. The Kastles got off to a quick start, taking the first two sets and building a 10–7 lead. Leander Paes and Sam Querrey won a tiebreaker in the opening set of men's doubles, and Anastasia Rodionova and Madison Brengle took a 5–3 set win in women's doubles. But Teymuraz Gabashvili put the Aces ahead, 12–10, with a 5–0 set win over Querrey in men's singles. Rodionova and Paes bounced back with a 5–2 set win in mixed doubles to put the Kastles back in front, 15–14, heading into the final set of women's singles. Elina Svitolina topped Madison Brengle, 5–1, to give the Aces a 19–16 victory and the best overall regular-season record in WTT for 2015.

Eastern Conference championship
The Kastles hosted the Philadelphia Freedoms in the Eastern Conference Championship Match on July 30, 2015. It was a dominant performance for Washington, as the Kastles took all five sets en route to a 25–9 victory for their fifth consecutive Eastern Conference title. Martina Hingis teamed with Leander Paes in the opening set of mixed doubles for a 5–1 set win and later with Anastasia Rodionova to take a tiebreaker in the fourth set of women's doubles. Madison Brengle chipped in by saving three break points and winning both 3-all points for a 5–2 set win in women's singles. Paes and Sam Querrey took the men's doubles set, 5–2. Querrey closed out the match with a 5–0 whitewash of Robby Ginepri in men's singles.

A fifth consecutive King Trophy
The Kastles won their fifth consecutive King Trophy as WTT champions when they defeated the Austin Aces in the WTT Final on August 2, 2015. The Kastles were led by their captain, WTT Final Most Valuable Player Leander Paes, who teamed with Martina Hingis to take the opening set of mixed doubles from Teymuraz Gabashvili and Alla Kudryavtseva, 5–2, and then with Sam Querrey to win the men's doubles set, 5–3, over Gabashvili and Jarmere Jenkins. Hingis and Anastasia Rodionova took the second set of women's doubles in a tiebreaker after each team broke the other's serve three times. With the Kastles leading, 15–9, Querrey faced Gabashvili, who led WTT in winning percentage in men's singles during the regular season. Querrey served six aces and won 14 of his 16 first-serve points to hold in all four of his service games without facing a break point or a 3-all point. Gabashvili matched Querrey's performance with four holds of his own that also featured no break point or 3-all point opportunities. Querrey was able to prevail in the tiebreaker game to give the Kastles a 20–13 lead heading to the final set. Madison Brengle faced Elina Svitolina in the final set of women's singles. Svitolina fell behind a break early in the set but broke back twice for a 5–3 set win that sent the match to extended play with the Kastles leading the match, 23–18. Brengle hit a backhand winner in the first game of extended play to end the match and secure the title for the Kastles.

After the match, Paes said, "It's just a beautiful moment to share. I've had a really long career and done some really special things, and this is way up there with the best of them. I'd like to dedicate this MVP award to every single Kastles member, not only on the court, but behind the scenes, and every single Kastles fan." Kastles coach Murphy Jensen said, "It's a dream come true. It's so different. You'd think this'd get old hat, but it doesn't. It was a bigger challenge, because players were coming and going during the season. But to get them all to perform the way they did against an extremely tough team says a lot about our organization."

Event chronology
 March 16, 2015: The Kastles protected Martina Hingis, Venus Williams, Leander Paes and Anastasia Rodionova and drafted Serena Williams and Sam Querrey at the WTT draft.
 May 6, 2015: The Kastles signed Madison Brengle as a substitute player.
 June 26, 2015: The Kastles signed Denis Kudla as a substitute player.
 July 10, 2015: The Kastles signed Rajeev Ram as a substitute player.
 July 24, 2015: With a record of 7 wins and 3 losses, the Kastles clinched a playoff berth with a 22–14 win over the Austin Aces.
 July 25, 2015: With a record of 7 wins and 3 losses, the Kastles clinched first place in the Eastern Conference and home-court advantage for the Eastern Conference Championship Match when the California Dream defeated the Boston Lobsters, 21–19, in extended play.
 July 30, 2015: The Kastles won the Eastern Conference championship with a 25–9 home victory against the Philadelphia Freedoms.
 August 2, 2015: The Kastles defeated the Austin Aces, 24–18, in extended play to win their fifth consecutive King Trophy as World TeamTennis Champions. Leander Paes was named WTT Final Most Valuable Player.

Draft picks
As defending WTT champions, the Kastles selected last in each round of the draft. Unlike previous seasons in which WTT conducted its Marquee Player Draft and its Roster Player Draft on different dates about one month apart, the league conducted a single draft at the Indian Wells Tennis Garden in Indian Wells, California on March 16, 2015. The selections made by the Kastles are shown in the table below.

Notes:

Match log

Regular season
{| align="center" border="1" cellpadding="2" cellspacing="1" style="border:1px solid #aaa"
|-
! colspan="2" style="background:#003372; color:white" | Legend
|-
! bgcolor="ccffcc" | Kastles Win
! bgcolor="ffbbbb" | Kastles Loss
|-
! colspan="2" | Home team in CAPS
|}

Playoffs
{| align="center" border="1" cellpadding="2" cellspacing="1" style="border:1px solid #aaa"
|-
! colspan="2" style="background:#003372; color:white" | Legend
|-
! bgcolor="ccffcc" | Kastles Win
! bgcolor="ffbbbb" | Kastles Loss
|-
! colspan="2" | Home team in CAPS
|}
Eastern Conference Championship Match

World TeamTennis Championship Match

Note:

Team personnel
Reference:

On-court personnel
  Murphy Jensen, Coach
  Madison Brengle
  Martina Hingis
  Denis Kudla
  Leander Paes
  Sam Querrey
  Rajeev Ram
  Anastasia Rodionova
  Serena Williams (injured, did not play)
  Venus Williams

Front office
 Mark D. Ein, Owner
 Kevin Wynne, General Manager

Notes:

Statistics
Players are listed in order of their game-winning percentage provided they played in at least 40% of the Kastles' games in that event, which is the WTT minimum for qualification for league leaders in individual statistical categories.

Men's singles – regular season

Women's singles – regular season

Men's doubles – regular season

Women's doubles – regular season

Mixed doubles – regular season

Team totals – regular season

Men's singles – playoffs

Women's singles – playoffs

Men's doubles – playoffs

Women's doubles – playoffs

Mixed doubles – playoffs

Team totals – playoffs

Men's singles – all matches

Women's singles – all matches

Men's doubles – all matches

Women's doubles – all matches

Mixed doubles – all matches

Team totals – all matches

Transactions
 July 27, 2014: Bobby Reynolds retired.
 March 16, 2015: The Kastles protected Martina Hingis, Venus Williams, Leander Paes and Anastasia Rodionova and drafted Serena Williams as a marquee player and Sam Querrey as a roster-exempt player at the WTT draft.
 March 31, 2015: The Kastles did not protect Kevin Anderson as a wildcard player effectively making him a free agent.
 May 6, 2015: The Kastles signed Madison Brengle as a substitute player.
 June 26, 2015: The Kastles signed Denis Kudla as a substitute player.
 July 10, 2015: The Kastles signed Rajeev Ram as a substitute player.

Individual honors and achievements
The following table shows individual honors bestowed upon players of the Washington Kastles in 2015.

Anastasia Rodionova led WTT in winning percentage in women's doubles. Leander Paes led WTT in winning percentage in men's doubles Sam Querrey was second in WTT in winning percentage in both men's singles and men's doubles. Madison Brengle was second in WTT in winning percentage in both women's singles and women's doubles.

See also

 Sports in Washington, D.C.

References

External links
Washington Kastles official website
World TeamTennis official website

Washington Kastles season
Washington Kastles